There's many a slip 'twixt the cup and the lip is an English proverb.
It implies that even when a good outcome or conclusion seems certain, things can still go wrong, similar in meaning to "don't count your chickens before they hatch".

The modern proverb dates to the early 19th century, with English-language predecessors dating back to the 16th century, based on Latin and Greek templates reaching back to at least the 2nd century.

Origin
There is a reference to the many things that can intervene between cup and lip already in an iambic verse by Lycophron (3rd century BC) quoted by Erasmus.

There is a slight similarity between the wording of the proverb and that of an unattributed Greek iambic trimeter verse quoted by Cicero in one of his letters Ad Atticum (51 BC), but here refers to the geographical distance between Cicero and his correspondent.

The English proverb is almost identical with a Greek hexameter, 

"Much there is between the cup and the tip of the lip."
This verse was proverbial at the time of Aulus Gellius (2nd century), who mentions it in his comment on the Latin phrase inter os atque offam (between the mouth and the morsel) used by Marcus Cato. 

The Greek verse is attributed to Palladas in The Greek Anthology (X, 32), but that is manifestly erroneous, since Palladas lived in the 4th century, two centuries after Aulus Gellius. 
The Loeb Classical Library edition of the Anthology says that the verse is "a very ancient proverb, by some attributed to Homer". 

The Greek proverb is mentioned in a scholium on the Argonautica. In this account, the verse was a comment by a seer who told Ancaeus, who was setting out on the perilous enterprise of the Argonauts, that he would never taste wine from his newly planted vineyard. On his safe return, Ancaeus filled a cup with the first wine from his vineyard and reproached the seer for what appeared to be a false prophecy. The seer responded with the verse and just then an alarm was raised that a wild boar was destroying the vineyard. Without tasting the wine, Ancaeus rushed out and was killed by the boar. Hence, the prophecy came to be true.

The proverb is referenced  in the anonymous 13th-century French work De l'oue au chapelain, 
Erasmus translated the Greek verse proverb into Latin verse as Multa cadunt inter calicem supremaque labra in Adagia (1523).

English proverb

An English translation of Erasmus' 1523 work by Richard Taverner in 1539 rendered the proverb as "Many thynges fall betwene the cuppe and the mouth ... Betwene the cuppe and the lyppes maye come many casualties".

The proverb appears in English also in William Lambarde's A Perambulation of Kent in 1576: "[M]any things happen (according to the proverbe) betweene the Cup and the Lippe". 
In the same year, George Pettie added to it: "Many things (as the saying is) happens betweene the cup and the lip, many thinges chaunce betweene the bourde and the bed" in Petite Palace. 
The version "manye thinges fall betweene the cup and the lippe" appears in 1580 in John Lyly's Euphues and His England. 
In Ben Jonson's play, A Tale of a Tub (1633) Erasmus's text is explicitly quoted and expanded: "Multa cadunt inter—you can ghesse the rest. /Many things fall betweene the cup, and lip: /And though they touch, you are not sure to drinke."

The Macmillan Book of Proverbs erroneously states that Miguel de Cervantes referenced the proverb in Don Quixote in 1605. However, although some English translations use the proverb, what is in the original text is a different, though similar, proverb: "Del dicho al hecho hay gran trecho" (More easily said than done).

In English, "many things happen between the cup and the lip" is first found in Robert Burton's The Anatomy of Melancholy (1621-1651).

The modern form of the English proverb develops in the early 19th century.
The first record of the rhyme between slip and lip is due to D. M. Moir in  Mansie Waugh (1824):  "There is many a slip 'tween the cup and the lip". The variant reading using  'twixt in place of  'tween is recorded in 1828: "There's many a slip 'twixt the cup and the lip."

The proverb is mentioned explicitly by in Catharine Maria Sedgwick's The Linwoods: or, "Sixty Years Since" in America (1835), in the form "there is many a slip between the cup and the lip".
The proverb is also alluded to in the voice of one of the characters earlier in the novel:
While a group of banditti ransack Mrs. Archer's house, the leader, Sam Hewson, drops a bottle of brandy; after it shatters, he says, "Ah, my men! there's a sign for us – we may have a worse slip than that 'tween the cup and the lip: so let's be off – come, Pat."  
Other
J. F. O'Connell (1836) has  "many a slip 'twixt cup and lip".
R. H. Barham's The Ingoldsby Legends: Lady Rohesia (1840) has 
"There is many a slip 'twixt the cup and the lip".

The proverb became very popular from the 1840s onward and throughout the later 19th century.
Slight variants in wording persist into current usage; this concerns mainly alteration between  'twixt, betwixt,  'tween and between on one hand, and optional use of the definite articles, the cup and the lip vs. cup and lip, on the other.
From the earliest days of its popularity, the proverb was often described as old and somewhat trite.
One of the earliest attestations of its modern form, in 1835, already describe it as "somewhat musty". 
The Encyclopædia Americana of 1847 cites it as an example for the triteness of proverbs in general: "a public speaker could not use the proverb "'Twixt cup and lip is many a slip," at least, not without some apology for its triteness".

Usage since 1850

1850  William Makepeace Thackeray's Pendennis.
1855 The phrase appears numerous times in the Chronicles of Barsetshire series (1855-1867) by Anthony Trollope, especially in connection with the engagement of Lily Dale to Adolphus Crosbie in The Small House at Allington and the engagement of Grace Crawley to Major Grantly in The Last Chronicle of Barset.
 1864 "The Cup and the Lip" is the title of the First Book (of four books) of Our Mutual Friend by Charles Dickens 1864-65
1967 The American pop group The Present recorded a song called "Many's the Slip Twixt the Cup and the Lip (or Baby the World Really Turns)" in 1967. The song, written by George Fischoff and Tony Powers, was released as a single on the Philips label but failed to chart. 
1988 Said by Emilio Estevez as Billy the Kid in the movie Young Guns.
 An allusion to the proverb is anecdotally attributed to W.V.O. Quine (1908–2000), in the form "There is many a slip betwixt subjective cup and objective lip."

References

English proverbs
English-language idioms